Jane Rubino is an author of mystery novels set in New Jersey, featuring entertainment reporter ‘Cat’ Fortunati Austen as an accidental detective. The books feature Cat's close knit Italian-American family and the diverse people of New Jersey. Cat is a widow and a relationship with homicide detective Victor Cardenas develops in the books.

With her daughter, Caitlen Rubino-Bradway, she has also written Lady Vernon and Her Daughter, inspired by Jane Austen's novella ‘'Lady Susan’' and the short story "What Would Austen Do?" that appeared in the anthology "Jane Austen Made Me Do It."  Rubino has also written several short stories for MX Publishing's Sherlockian anthologies, The MX Books of New Sherlock Holmes Stories.

Books
Death of a DJ, 1995
Fruitcake, 1997
Cheat the Devil, 1998
(Contributor) Homicide for the Holidays, 2000
Plot Twist: A Cat Austen/ Victor Cardenas Mystery, 2000
Knight Errant: The Singular Adventures of Sherlock Holmes, 2001
Deadly Morsels: Cake Job, 2003
Raise the Dead, 2004
Lady Vernon and Her Daughter, 2009
Hidden Fires: A "Holmes Before Baker Street" Adventure, 2022

See also
List of female detective characters
List of female detective/mystery writers
Mystery fiction
Crime fiction

References

20th-century American novelists
21st-century American novelists
American women novelists
American mystery writers
Living people
Novelists from New Jersey
Women mystery writers
20th-century American women writers
21st-century American women writers
Year of birth missing (living people)